J. B. Bobo (11 February 1910 in Texarkana, Texas – 12 September 1996) was a magician most known for his work and writing in the arena of coin magic.

His work entitled Modern Coin Magic (originally published in 1952) is still considered today to be a core reference by most magicians.

He also wrote Watch This One! — a collection of magical effects performable with small objects.
He once disappointed a young crowd due to having a car accident while attempting to drive to a show at Howell Elementary in Springhill, Louisiana.

Bobo's great-grandfather was Jean Beaubeaux who, when immigrating to America, was induced to spell his name 'Bobo', a phonetic transliteration of the French Beaubeaux into English.

References

External links
 Biography at The Encyclopedia of Arkansas History & Culture

1910 births
1996 deaths
American magicians
Writers from Texas
Coin magic